President Johnson may refer to:
 Andrew Johnson (1808–1875), 17th president of the United States
 Presidency of Andrew Johnson, his presidency
 Hilary R. W. Johnson (1837–1901), 11th president of Liberia
 Lyndon B. Johnson (1963–1969), 36th president of the United States
 Presidency of Lyndon B. Johnson, his presidency
 William Johnson, fictional president of the United States in the TV series The First Family

Other uses
 , named for the 17th president of the United States

See also
 Johnson (disambiguation)